Philip of Hesse-Philippsthal (14 December 1655 – 18 June 1721) was the son of William VI, Landgrave of Hesse-Kassel and Hedwig Sophia of Brandenburg. He was the first landgrave of Hesse-Philippsthal from 1663 to 1721 and the founder of the fifth branch of the house of Hesse.

Marriage and issue 
In 1680, Philip of Hesse-Philipsthal married Catherine of Solms-Laubach (1654–1736) (daughter of Count Charles Otto of Solms-Laubach).  They had 8 children:

 Wilhelmine of Hesse-Philipstahl (1681–1699)
 Charles I of Hesse-Philippsthal, landgrave of Hesse-Philippsthal
 Amélie of Hesse-Philippsthal (1684–1754)
 Amoene of Hesse-Philippsthal (1685–1686)
 Philip of Hesse-Philipsthal (1686–1717) who, in 1714, married Marie von Limburg (1689–1759, (daughter of comte Albert von Limburg) and had children with her
 Henriette of Hesse-Philippsthal (1688–1761)
 William of Hesse-Philippsthal-Barchfeld, landgrave of Hesse-Philippsthal-Barchfeld, founder of the sixth branch of the House of Hesse
 Sophie of Hesse-Philippsthal (1695–1728) who in 1723 married Peter August, Duke of Schleswig-Holstein-Sonderburg-Beck (who died in 1775).

Branch 
Philip of Hesse-Philippsthal belonged to the Hesse-Philipsthal branch - this fifth branch was issued from the first branch of the House of Hesse, itself issuing from the first branch of the House of Brabant.

After the abdication of landgrave Ernest of Hesse-Philippsthal (1846-1925) in 1868, the Hesse-Philippsthal branch perpetuated itself through the sixth branch of Hesse-Philippsthal-Barchfeld, currently represented by William of Hesse-Philippsthal (1933-).

Ancestry

Sources 
 genroy.free.fr

1655 births
1721 deaths
Landgraves of Hesse
Modern child monarchs
House of Hesse